Saint Quintian (Quintianus, Quinctianus, Quintien) (died ca. 525) was a bishop of Rodez and a bishop of Clermont-Ferrand (Arvernes) in the sixth century, and participated in the Councils of Agde (508) and Orleans (511).

Life
Tradition makes him a native of Africa and a priest of Carthage who fled to France due to the persecutions of the Vandals.  At the death of Saint Amantius (Amans) in 487, Quintian succeeded him as bishop of Rodez.  During the war between the Franks and the West Goths, he was a zealous supporter of Clovis I. To avoid the persecutions of the Arian Visigoths, he fled Rodez and proceeded to Auvergne, where he was hospitably received by Bishop Euphrasius (Eufrèse). King Theodoric I appointed Quinctianus successor to Sidonius Apollinaris (grandson of the famous Sidonius Apollinaris), Bishop of Clermont. On the death of the latter, Quinctianus succeeded to the See of Clermont, which he occupied until his death on November 13, 525 or 526

Veneration
His feast is celebrated on November 13, except at Rodez, where it is kept on June 14. In the "Roman Martyrology" his name stands under both dates.

References

External links
 
 

Bishops of Clermont
Bishops of Rodez
French Roman Catholic saints
Saints from the Vandal Kingdom
6th-century Frankish saints